Colias ladakensis, the Ladakh clouded yellow, is a small butterfly of the family Pieridae, that is, the whites and yellows, that is found in India.

See also
List of butterflies of India
List of butterflies of India (Pieridae)

References
 
  
 
 
 

ladakensis
Butterflies described in 1865
Butterflies of Asia
Taxa named by Baron Cajetan von Felder